Howard Holt "Red" Blair (February 21, 1900 – November 30, 1947) was an American football and basketball player, coach, and college athletics administrator in Ohio and Missouri.  He served as the head football coach of the University of Akron from 1927 to 1935 and at Southwest Missouri State College—now known as Missouri State University—from 1938 to 1946, compiling a career college football record of 82–50–12.  Blair was also the head coach of Akron Zips men's basketball team from 1927 to 1936, tallying a mark of 89–40.  Blair grew up in Mount Vernon, Ohio and played football and basketball at Ohio State University.  He was a member of the 1920 Ohio State Buckeyes football team that played in the Rose Bowl.  Blair died on November 30, 1947 at his farm near Springfield, Missouri.

Head coaching record

Football

Basketball

References

External links
 

1900 births
1947 deaths
American football halfbacks
American men's basketball players
Basketball coaches from Ohio
Akron Zips football coaches
Akron Zips men's basketball coaches
Missouri State Bears and Lady Bears athletic directors
Missouri State Bears football coaches
Ohio State Buckeyes football coaches
Ohio State Buckeyes football players
Ohio State Buckeyes men's basketball players
People from Mount Vernon, Ohio
Players of American football from Ohio
Basketball players from Ohio